The Ultimate Collection is a compact disc by The Four Tops, released on Motown Records, catalogue 314530825-2, in October 1997. It is a collection of singles comprising many of the group's greatest hits, with liner notes written by Stu Hackel.

Content
The disc contains all but three of the Top 40 hits on the Billboard Hot 100 enjoyed by the Four Tops and released on the Motown Records imprint. Four of the tracks included were b-sides — "I Got A Feeling," "If You Don't Want My Love," "I'll Turn to Stone," and "Sad Souvenirs" — "I Got A Feeling" being the flip to "Bernadette," and "Sad Souvenirs" the flip to "I Can't Help Myself." "A Simple Game" was recorded in collaboration with The Moody Blues, and hit #3 on the UK Singles Chart. Every iconic song by the group is present, and five of the tracks were in the top ten on the chart, with "I Can't Help Myself" and "Reach Out I'll Be There" both going to #1. The disc was part of an "Ultimate Collection" series issued that year by Motown for many of their top-selling classic artists.

Starting in the late 1960s and early 1970s, standard industry practice shifted to a focus on album sales, where a single became less a separate entity and more simply an advertisement for an LP, and a lead single would be pulled off an album as a promotional tool. Prior to this, singles were concentrated upon as a profitable commodity, especially for smaller record labels, and albums were often built around already successful singles. Since Motown fixated on the hit single until the very end of its stay in Detroit, single versions of songs often featured different mixes than versions that would be later placed on albums. Singles were usually mixed "punchier" and "hotter" to sound better on car radios receiving AM broadcast. The single versions are the ones appearing here.

Personnel
 Levi Stubbs — lead vocals
 Abdul "Duke" Fakir — vocals
 Renaldo "Obie" Benson — vocals
 Lawrence Payton — vocals
 The Andantes — additional backing vocals on certain tracks
 The Funk Brothers — instruments
 Members of the Detroit Symphony Orchestra conducted by Gordon Staples — strings

Track listing
Singles chart peak positions from Billboard charts; no R&B chart existed from November 30, 1963, through January 23, 1965. Track with The Moody Blues marked with an asterisk.

Certifications

References

Four Tops compilation albums
1997 compilation albums
Motown compilation albums